Rachelle Boone-Smith (born June 30, 1981) is an American former sprint athlete.

She won the 200 metres silver medal at the 2005 World Championships in Athletics. Prior to the 2005 World Championships she had competed only in one international major event, namely the 2004 World Indoor Championships where she did not reach the final.

Personal bests
100 metres : 11.02 (2006)
200 metres : 22.22 (2005)

International competitions

See also
List of World Championships in Athletics medalists (women)

References

1981 births
Living people
Sportspeople from Norfolk, Virginia
Track and field athletes from Virginia
American female sprinters
African-American female track and field athletes
World Athletics Championships medalists
World Athletics Championships athletes for the United States
21st-century African-American sportspeople
21st-century African-American women
20th-century African-American people
20th-century African-American women